George Tayloe Winston (October 12, 1852 – August 26, 1932) was an American educator and university administrator.

Early years
Winston was born at Windsor, North Carolina, to Patrick Henry Winston and Martha Elizabeth Byrd, and the brother of Francis D. Winston. Winston entered the University of North Carolina at Chapel Hill at the age of thirteen, where he was a member of the Chi Phi Fraternity and the Philanthropic Society. He then studied at the United States Naval Academy from 1868 to 1870, standing at the head of his class of seventy. He could not overcome violent nausea at sea and resigned. In 1870 he went to Cornell University, where he received a bachelor's in literature in 1874 and won membership in Phi Beta Kappa. Later honorary degrees included an A.M. from Davidson College in 1877 and LL.D. degrees from both Duke University and the University of North Carolina in 1911.

Career

University of North Carolina 
When the University of North Carolina was reopened after the Civil War, Winston, although only twenty-three years old, was elected adjunct professor of Latin and German. Promoted to professor the next year, he taught Latin and German and served as secretary of the faculty until 1891, when he was elected president of the university at the age of thirty-nine. He went to work with great energy and ability to make the state conscious of the university. He had a difficult task for North Carolina was still miserably poor from the effects of the war, but in five years the university's income was doubled, and its enrollment was almost tripled.

University of Texas 
Winston was invited to deliver the commencement address at the University of Texas at Austin in June 1896. Discussing the influence of universities and public schools on national life and character, he spoke so effectively that the board of regents shortly elected him the university's first regular president. Leslie Waggener had been president ad interim. Winston entered on his work in Texas with the same vigor that he had shown in North Carolina. He made speeches, wrote articles, attended conventions, and labored with all classes of people to make them look upon the university as their own. The curriculum was revised, able instructors were brought to the faculty, the University Record was inaugurated, B. Hall and the Main Building were enlarged, but Winston was unhappy over slowness in improvements and accepted the presidency of the North Carolina State College of Agriculture and Mechanic Arts in 1899.

North Carolina State University
During his tenure as president of the North Carolina College of Agriculture and Mechanical Arts, now North Carolina State University, the college developed a new textiles curriculum and began offering summer courses. Winston's poor health led him to accept a Carnegie Pension and retire in 1908. He died in Durham, North Carolina, on August 26, 1932. Winston received many honors, among them the presidency of the Association of Southern Colleges and Secondary Schools in 1895. His publications included numerous reports, addresses, and articles, and one book, Daniel Augustus Tompkins, a Builder of the New South (1920).

Winston Hall on the campus of North Carolina State University is named in his honor. Built in 1910 and renovated in 1988, Winston Hall currently houses the College of Humanities and Social Sciences.

Personal life
He was married on June 5, 1876, to Caroline S. Taylor of Hinsdale, New Hampshire; they became parents of four children.

References

Sources
Virtual Museum of UNC History
University of Texas
NC State University

1852 births
1932 deaths
Cornell University alumni
Duke University alumni
Chancellors of North Carolina State University
Leaders of the University of North Carolina at Chapel Hill
Presidents of the University of Texas at Austin
People from Windsor, North Carolina
Educators from North Carolina
19th-century American educators
20th-century American educators